Sheikha in Iran may refer to:
 Shorkan